USNS Kanawha (T-AO-196) is a Henry J. Kaiser-class fleet replenishment oiler of the United States Navy in non-commissioned service in the Military Sealift Command.

USNS Kanawha, the tenth Henry J. Kaiser-class ship, was laid down by the Avondale Shipyards in New Orleans, Louisiana, on 13 July 1989. She was launched on 22 September 1990 and delivered to the U.S. Navy and placed in non-commissioned service with the Military Sealift Command on 6 December 1991.

Kanawha is in active service with the Military Sealift Command Naval Fleet Auxiliary Force and is assigned to the U.S. Atlantic Fleet.

Design
The Henry J. Kaiser-class oilers were preceded by the shorter Cimarron-class fleet replenishment oilers.

They were built without armaments but can be fitted with close-in weapon systems. The ship has a helicopter platform but not any maintenance facilities. It has a complement of eighty-nine civilians (nineteen officers), twenty-nine spare crew, and six United States Navy crew.

Collision
There were no injuries, but both ships suffered "superficial" damage consisting of scrapes and dents on both hulls.

References

NavSource Online: Service Ship Photo Archive T-AO-196 Kanawha
USNS Kanawha (T-AO-196)

 

Henry J. Kaiser-class oilers
Cold War auxiliary ships of the United States
1990 ships